Sheikh Fazlul Haque Mani Stadium  is an association football stadium which is located by the Court Mosque, Gopalganj, Bangladesh. Bangladesh Premier League (football) club Muktijoddha Sangsad KS is using this stadium as their home ground since 2012-13 season. This is the 7th venue used for Bangladesh Premier League (BPL) matches

See also
Stadiums in Bangladesh
List of football stadiums in Bangladesh
List of association football stadiums by country
Sheikh Kamal Stadium
List of stadiums in Asia

References

Football venues in Bangladesh